Jung Jong-Kwan  (9 September 1981 – 30 May 2011) was a South Korean footballer.

He was involved in the 2011 South Korean football betting scandal.

He was found dead of a suspected suicide by hanging himself at his hotel room in Seoul.

References

External links 

1981 births
2011 deaths
Association football midfielders
South Korean footballers
Jeonbuk Hyundai Motors players
K League 1 players
K3 League players
People from Changwon
Soongsil University alumni
Suicides by hanging in South Korea
2011 suicides
Sportspeople from South Gyeongsang Province